Kosmos 608 ( meaning Cosmos 608), known before launch as DS-P1-Yu No.69, was a Soviet satellite which was launched in 1973 as part of the Dnepropetrovsk Sputnik programme. It was a  spacecraft, which was built by the Yuzhnoye Design Bureau, and was used as a radar calibration target for anti-ballistic missile tests.

Launch 
Kosmos 608 was successfully launched into low Earth orbit at 12:29:58 UTC on 20 November 1973. The launch took place from Site 133/1 at the Plesetsk Cosmodrome, and used a Kosmos-2I 63SM carrier rocket.

Orbit 
Upon reaching orbit, the satellite was assigned its Kosmos designation, and received the International Designator 1973-091A. The North American Aerospace Defense Command assigned it the catalogue number 06941.

Kosmos 608 was the sixty-sixth of seventy nine DS-P1-Yu satellites to be launched, and the sixtieth of seventy two to successfully reach orbit. It remained in orbit until it decayed and reentered the atmosphere on 10 July 1974.

See also 

 1973 in spaceflight

References 

1973 in spaceflight
Kosmos satellites
Spacecraft launched in 1973
Dnepropetrovsk Sputnik program